Canada has participated in all 39 World Under-20 Championships, an annual ice hockey tournament organized by the International Ice Hockey Federation (IIHF). The first World Under-20 Championship was held in 1974, although the IIHF considers the first three years to be unofficial invitational  tournaments. In 1977, the Ice Hockey World Championships became an "open competition" which allowed all players, professional and amateur, to participate. With National Hockey League (NHL) players participating in the tournament, IIHF officials began to fear that true amateurs and young players were losing their places. As a result, full world championship status was given to the World Under-20 Championship. Colloquially known as the World Junior Hockey Championship, the event was structured after the World Championships, but limited to players under the age of 20. During the first years of the tournament, Canada did not have a national team, instead choosing to send a club team, typically the Memorial Cup winner. In 1978, an all-star team was sent. The first national junior team participated in the 1982 tournament, and became the first Canadian team to win a gold medal. Canada has won more gold medals than any other nation and has had two five-year gold medal winning streaks, during 1993–1997 and 2005–2009. The Canadian team is usually composed mostly of players from the Canadian Hockey League, a major junior umbrella organization that consists of the Ontario Hockey League, Quebec Major Junior Hockey League and Western Hockey League.

One of the most infamous incidents in tournament history occurred in 1987 in Piestany, Czechoslovakia, where a massive brawl involving all players on both teams occurred between Canada and the Soviet Union. It began when Pavel Kostichkin took a two-handed slash at Theoren Fleury and the Soviet Union's Evgeny Davydov came off the bench, eventually leading to most of the players from both teams joining the brawl. The officials, unable to break up the fight, walked off the ice and eventually tried shutting off the arena lights, but the brawl lasted for 20 minutes before the game was declared null and void. An emergency IIHF meeting resulted in the delegates voting 7–1 to disqualify both teams from the tournament. While the Soviets were out of medal contention, Canada was playing for the gold medal, and were leading 4–2 at the time of the brawl. The gold medal ultimately went to Finland, hosts Czechoslovakia took the silver and Sweden, who had been eliminated from medal contention, was awarded the bronze. The IIHF voted to suspend all players involved from competing in international events for 18 months, and all coaches for three years. Player suspensions were later cut to six months, which allowed eligible players such as Fleury to participate in the 1988 tournament. The brawl helped raise the profile of the tournament in Canada, where the tournament now ranks as one of the most important hockey events.

Since 1977, Canada has participated in every tournament, sending 673 players: 64 goaltenders and 609 skaters (forwards and defencemen). During this period, Canadian teams have won 29 medals: 16 gold, eight silver and five bronze. Canadian cities have hosted the tournament a combined 11 times, more than any other nation. Because of the age restrictions, the majority of players have participated in only one tournament. However, 142 players (131 skaters, 11 goaltenders) have played in two tournaments. Seven players—Jason Botterill, Jay Bouwmeester, Ryan Ellis, Trevor Kidd, Martin Lapointe, Eric Lindros and Jason Spezza—have played in three tournaments. As of 2015, 513 players (464 skaters and 49 goaltenders), or 76.3% of players, have won at least one medal. Of that number, 298 (29 goaltenders and 269 skaters), or 44.3% of all players, have won at least one gold medal. Forty-four players (41 skaters and 3 goaltenders), or 6.5%, have won two or more gold medals. Jason Botterill is the only Canadian player to win three gold medals (1994–1996), while three other players have also won three medals: Jason Spezza and Jay Bouwmeester (both 2000–2002) won two bronze and one silver, while Ryan Ellis (2009–2011) won a gold and two silvers. Eric Lindros, who scored 12 goals and 19 assists for a total of 31 points over three tournaments (1990–1992), is Canada's all-time assists and points leader in the tournament. Jordan Eberle, who played in the 2009 and 2010 tournaments, is Canada's all-time leading goal scorer, with 14 goals.


Key

Goaltenders

Skaters

See also
 List of Olympic men's ice hockey players for Canada
 List of Men's World Ice Hockey Championship players for Canada (1977–present)
 List of Canadian national ice hockey team rosters
 List of IIHF World Under-20 Championship medalists

Notes
Note 1—Canada's seventh game in the 1987 World Championships against the Soviet Union was not completed and declared null and void because of a bench-clearing brawl between the two teams. Canada had been winning 4–2, but the statistics of that game are not included here.

References
General

Specific

External links

 Hockey Canada – Official website

Canada
Canada
World